Nakatu is an area in Ringiste village, Valga Parish, Valga County in southeastern Estonia.

References

External links 
Satellite map at Maplandia.com

Valga Parish